In geometry, the biaugmented truncated cube is one of the Johnson solids.  As its name suggests, it is created by attaching two square cupolas onto two parallel octagonal faces of a truncated cube.

External links
 

Johnson solids